 

A list of American Utopian communities.

1800s

1900s

See also 
 List of Finnish utopian communities
 List of Fourierist Associations in the United States
 Federation of Egalitarian Communities
 Fourierism
 Icarians
 List of intentional communities
 List of Owenite communities in the United States
 Owenism
 Shakers

References